The Opportunity to Be is the second EP released by American metal band My Ticket Home. It was released on November 8, 2010, through Rise Records. It is the band's first release with Rise Records, as well as the only album to feature guitarist Eli Ford.

Track listing

Personnel
My Ticket Home
 Nick Giumenti – unclean vocals
 Sean Mackowski – guitars, clean vocals
 Eli Ford – guitars
 Luke Fletcher - bass
 Marshal Giumenti – drums

Production
 Caleb Shomo – production, engineered, mastering, mixing, keyboards, programming

2010 EPs
My Ticket Home albums
Rise Records EPs